Charles Bruce Sissons, FRSC (1879May 27, 1965) was a Canadian historian.

Charles Bruce Sissons was born in 1879 in Crown Hill, Ontario (now part of Springwater). He graduated from Victoria College (now Victoria University, Toronto) with a degree in classics in 1901, taking the gold medal.

Sissons taught in Revelstoke, British Columbia, for four years before coming to Victoria College to teach classics. He retired in 1947 and died on May 27, 1965, in Toronto.

He received the J. B. Tyrrell Historical Medal in 1952.

Books 

 Egerton Ryerson: His Life and Letters (volume 1, 1937; volume 2, 1947)
 A History of Victoria University (1952)
 Church & State in Canadian Education: An Historical Study (1959)
Nil Alienum: The Memoirs of C. B. Sissons (1964)

References

External links
 

1879 births
1965 deaths
20th-century Canadian historians
20th-century Canadian male writers
Fellows of the Royal Society of Canada
University of Toronto alumni
Academic staff of the University of Toronto